Since its turnaround in the early-1980s, the New Musical Express (more commonly known as the NME) has occasionally supplied vinyl, cassettes and more recently CDs on its cover. Many popular alternative artists have appeared on NME compilations, including The Smiths, Blur, Franz Ferdinand, The Stone Roses and The Libertines.

The NME have also issued compilation albums for sale, such as In A Field of Their Own and Ruby Trax.

History
NME have included covermount albums for a long time. The Clash's release Capital Radio, which was released 9 April 1977, could only be obtained by sending away a coupon featured in one issue of the NME, and the red sticker from the cover of the band's debut album. The NME also released the much regarded compilation album C86, documenting the birth of jangling indie pop, in 1986. Big Audio Dynamite II released their second album The Globe with a coupon, which had to be sent to the NME, to receive their  first live album. In 1992–1993, NME released their own compilations, In a Field of Their Own and Ruby Trax, all containing exclusive recordings. Around this time, they started covermounting cassettes on their magazines, such as the Brat Pack series, and NME Xmas Dust Up in late 1994, a mix by The Chemical Brothers (their fourth and final release using their original The Dust Brothers). In 1997, Beat Up the NME, mixed by Fatboy Slim, was also a covermount. A list of the covermounts is below. In 2005–2007, the NME released more commercially sold compilations like those from 1992 to 1993, The Essential Bands series. Also, NME released a commercially available album, also featuring exclusive recordings like their 1992–1993 albums, NME In Association With War Child Presents 1 Love, as a charity album in 2002.

Discography

1992

1995

1996

1997

1998

1999

2000

2001

2002

2003

2004

2005

2006

See also
NME Album of the Year

NME releases
1977: Capital Radio
1981: C81
1986: C86
1988: Sgt. Pepper Knew My Father
1991: Ally Pally Paradiso
1993: Ruby Trax
1994: Dog Man Star
1997: Beat Up the NME
2002: NME In Association With War Child Presents 1 Love
2006: NME Presents the Essential Bands 2006
2008: NME Awards 2008
2008: Violet Hill
2008: Dig Out Your Soul Songbook

Compilation albums included with magazines
Compilation album series
Compilation albums